Jamie Ross is a fictional character on the TV drama Law & Order, created by Rene Balcer and portrayed by Carey Lowell from 1996 to 1998 and 2022. She also appears in the short-lived Law & Order spin-off Law & Order: Trial by Jury, by which time the character has become a judge. She appeared in 53 episodes (50 episodes of Law & Order, one episode of Homicide: Life on the Street, and two episodes of Law & Order: Trial by Jury)

As series regular
The character was introduced in 1996 as a former defense attorney who graduated from law school at Columbia University. She enters the Manhattan District Attorney's office as an Assistant District Attorney, replacing Claire Kincaid (Jill Hennessy), who had been killed in a car accident in the previous episode. She initially has a rocky relationship with her superior Jack McCoy (Sam Waterston) because his penchant for bending trial rules goes against her liberal idealism and sense of legal ethics. While the two never see perfectly eye-to-eye, they eventually grow to be close friends.

During the 1997–98 season, Ross's personal and professional life was thrown into disarray by a custody battle with her ex-husband, Neil Gorton (Keith Szarabajka), over their daughter Katie (Caralyn Gorel). For the next year, the brutal litigation against her ex-husband (who is also a lawyer, with whom she used to work) leaves her with increasingly less time to devote to her job. She leaves the DA's office in the 1998 episode "Monster", to remarry and find a job that gives her more time to be with her family. She is replaced by Abbie Carmichael (Angie Harmon) in the following episode, "Cherished".

Ross is initially a supporter of the death penalty, but by the end of season 8 she has become an opponent.  She later explains this development: "When I worked at the DA's office, I saw the death penalty applied. ADAs are overworked. They're competitive. They often act out of their own prejudices or personal hurts. What they think the politics demands. They make mistakes. Errors of judgment. The death penalty is final. It eliminates any chance of correcting those mistakes."

Guest appearances
Lowell returned to the character in the 1999 episode "Justice", in which Ross and McCoy share a courtroom as adversaries. Once again a defense attorney, she represents a client McCoy is prosecuting for murder. When McCoy discovers she had violated that defendant's confidence in a previous action, Ross recuses herself. She reports herself to the Disciplinary Committee of the New York Supreme Court, Appellate Division, which eventually exonerates her with help from McCoy's testimony on her behalf.

Ross appears on the Homicide: Life of the Street episode "Baby It's You", where she assists in the prosecution of the primary suspect in the murder of a teen model.

Lowell appears as Ross again, as a defense attorney, in the 2001 episode "School Daze", when she represents a student who had killed several classmates in a school shooting. At first, Ross has the upper hand, getting a handgun and other evidence dismissed due to a suppression ruling against detectives Lennie Briscoe (Jerry Orbach) and Ed Green (Jesse L. Martin), who use privileged medical information from a school psychiatrist to identify the suspect following an anonymous e-mail threatening to "come back and finish the job". However, when new evidence emerges and the judge decides the boy is competent to stand trial, the case is reinstated. After the boy's father (who believes his son would kill again if freed) testifies on the stand that his son had admitted the crime to him, the boy is convicted.

In 2005, Ross is reintroduced in the spin-off series Law & Order: Trial by Jury as a trial judge. She appears in two episodes: "41 Shots", in which she is seen eating at a restaurant with two other judges while having a conversation, and "Bang & Blame", in which she presides over the trial of a murderer who decides to represent himself pro se after killing a woman on video in the middle of a crowded bank lobby.

When the original series returned for its twenty-first season in February 2022, Ross was revealed to have rejoined the District Attorney's Office. In the episode "The Right Thing", a singer named Henry King whom Ross helped prosecute for rape was released because she had gone back on a promise not to do so. When the singer is later murdered by one of his victims, Ross, who is initially considered a suspect by Detective Frank Cosgrove (Jeffrey Donovan) after she is seen on a surveillance video confronting King, is later discovered to have potentially assisted the victim in some manner in the commission of the said crime. She refuses to admit any role in the killing and when subpoenaed to testify, Ross asserts her Fifth Amendment rights against self-incrimination. After her testimony concludes, a stunned Jack McCoy can only watch in silence as she leaves. The defendant is eventually convicted as a silent Ross sits among the gallery while the court erupts in protest over the verdict.

Behind the scenes

In a case of life imitating art, Lowell requested to leave the show in order to spend more time with her daughter, as she felt that the time she spent filming the drama was causing her to "miss her [daughter's] childhood".

References

Law & Order characters
Fictional assistant district attorneys
Fictional American lawyers
Fictional judges
Fictional characters from New York City
Fictional Columbia University people
Television characters introduced in 1996
Crossover characters in television
American female characters in television
pt:Jamie Ross